Ampitatafika is a suburb and a rural commune in Analamanga Region, in the  Central Highlands of Madagascar. It belongs to the district of Antananarivo-Atsimondrano and its populations numbers to 50,373 in 2018.

The National Road 1 crosses this suburb.

Rivers
The Sisaony and the Ikopa River.

References

Populated places in Analamanga